Quorum Park is a speculative office development in North Tyneside, North East England, with about 1 million square feet of office space.

Overview
Quorum was part of the North Tyneside Enterprise Zone that ran from 1996 to 2006.  The site was originally occupied by the US Corporation Viasystems who had a major semiconductor manufacturing plant on the site.  When that plant closed, the site was bought by the current owners who redeveloped the site into a major business park.  Funding for the development was raised by Tritax with construction undertaken by Grantside, both joint venture partners in the development company.

In 2009 and 2010, Quorum made the headlines with a series of lettings including some notable job creating inward investments. Almost 250,000 square feet of office space was let to six new companies including major occupiers such as Tesco Bank, Balfour Beatty and Convergys.

British Engines relocated their central core services teams to the park in December 2013.  In August 2014 the building and energy services company Cofely moved into a 26,000sqft office building in the business park.

In 2016, Greggs moved its head office from its previous Jesmond location to Quorum Business Park.

In November 2019, Shelborne Asset Management acquired a large proportion of the park for £32m. As part of the acquisition the park was rebranded in 2020 in order to improve its image.

As part of the rebrand the business park became known simply as ‘Quorum Park’.

Transport
Arriva North East runs several bus services to Quorum from Newcastle, North Tyneside and Northumberland, as well as the dedicated Quorum Shuttle service 555 which connects workers with the Tyne and Wear Metro station at Four Lane Ends. Stagecoach North East also operates services 62 and 63 between Killingworth, Newcastle and the western suburbs via the park.

Discounted travel is available for journeys between Four Lane Ends and Quorum for those holding a Q-card, a discount card issued to employees of companies based in the park.

The park promotes cycling to onsite staff with access to free cycle servicing and cycle hire.

Facilities
Quorum operates sports clubs, with workers able to access football, tennis or netball at no cost. There is also a PureGym located within the park.

The park also includes shops, a Greggs bakery, a cafe and a nursery.

References

External links 
 Quorum Business Park

Buildings and structures in Newcastle upon Tyne